USS Telesforo Trinidad (DDG-139) is a planned  guided missile destroyer of the United States Navy, the 89th overall for the class. She will honor Fireman 2nd class Telesforo Trinidad, the only Filipino in the US Navy to ever be awarded the Medal of Honor.

References

 

Arleigh Burke-class destroyers
Proposed ships of the United States Navy